Manganese violet is the common name for ammonium manganese(III) pyrophosphate, an inorganic compound composed of ammonium, manganese in the +3 oxidation state, and the pyrophosphate anion. It is prepared by heating a mixture of manganese(III) oxide, diammonium phosphate, and phosphoric acid. This material is a popular inorganic pigment.

Chemical structure
Two polymorphs are known, referred to as the α- and β-forms, but in each case the structures are similar. The Mn(III) centres occupy distorted octahedral sites, being surrounded by six oxygens provided by the pyrophosphate ligands.

Spectra
IR-spectra, reflectance, and fluorescence spectra can be found at ColourLex.

Use
Manganese violet is used in eye liner pencils, eye shadow, lipstick, nail enamel, and oil paint.

See also
List of inorganic pigments

References

Manganese(III) compounds
Pyrophosphates
Inorganic pigments
Double salts